The Indiana Academy for Science, Mathematics, and Humanities (The Indiana Academy) is a nationally ranked public high school located on the campus of Ball State University in Muncie, Indiana. The Academy offers both residential and non-residential (commuter) options for juniors and seniors. As of the 2022-2023 academic year, a non-residential only pilot program for high school sophomores has been added, though it remains to be seen if it will persist.  Admission is open to high ability, gifted, and talented high school students living anywhere in Indiana.

The Indiana Academy was founded in 1988 by the Indiana General Assembly. and is a part of Ball State's Teachers College. The first group of Academy juniors started in the fall of 1990.

Nearly 100% of graduates will attend 4-year colleges or other post-secondary education. For the Class of 2020, the average SAT score was 1336 vs the Indiana average of 1085 and the National average of 1059. The Indiana Academy offers courses in twelve AP subjects.

Athletics

The Academy's athletes participate in sports with the teams of Burris Laboratory School.

Alumni
Alumni include prominent doctors, surgeons, lawyers, teachers, professors, writers, and engineers.

References

External links
Official website

Public high schools in Indiana
NCSSS schools
Charter schools in Indiana
Gifted education
Schools in Delaware County, Indiana
Educational institutions established in 1988
Ball State University
Buildings and structures in Muncie, Indiana
Education in Muncie, Indiana
Public boarding schools in the United States
Boarding schools in Indiana
1988 establishments in Indiana